Killick's  Mill is a Grade II* listed Smock mill in Meopham, Kent, England  that was built in 1801 and which has been restored.

History

Killick's mill was built in 1801 by three brothers named Killick from Strood. Unusually, the mill is hexagonal in plan. Most smock mills are octagonal in plan. The mill was run by the Killick family until 1889 when it was sold to the Norton family. The mill last worked by wind in 1929, and then by oil engine and electric motor until the 1965. The mill was acquired by Kent County Council in 1960 and restored by E Hole and Sons, the Burgess Hill millwrights at a cost of £4,375.

Description

Killick's Mill is a three-storey smock mill on a two-storey single-storey brick base. There is a stage at second-floor level. It has four double patent sails carried on a cast-iron windshaft. The mill is winded by a fantail. The wooden Brake Wheel is  diameter. The Wallower and Great Spur Wheel are of cast iron. When the mill was built, it had two pairs of millstones. Later a third and then a fourth pair were added. One of the added pair of stones came from Richardson's mill, Boughton under Blean, as did the  auxiliary oil engine. The stones are driven overdrift. At one time, the mill generated its own electricity to power electric lights within the mill.

Millers

James Killick 1801 - 1823
Sukey Killick 1823 -
James Killick  1852 - 1889
Richard Killick 1882 - 1889
Thomas Killick 1882 - 1889
John Norton 1889 - 
William Norton 1889 -
Leslie Norton
J & W Norton 1895 - 1950s
J & W Norton (Meopham) Ltd.  1950s - 1965

References for above:-

Culture and Media

Killick's Mill appeared briefly in stock footage used in an episode of The Prisoner titled The Girl Who Was Death which was filmed in 1967 and first shown in 1968.

References

External links
Windmill World page on the mill.
Visiting information

Windmills in Kent
Grinding mills in the United Kingdom
Smock mills in England
Grade II* listed buildings in Kent
Museums in the Borough of Gravesham
Mill museums in England
Windmills completed in 1801
Hexagonal buildings